Penn State Harrisburg, also called The Capital College, is an undergraduate college and graduate school of the Pennsylvania State University located in Lower Swatara Township, Pennsylvania. The campus is located 9 miles (15 km) south of Harrisburg. The campus enrolls over 4,621 students as of 2021 and offers two associate, 34 baccalaureate, 24 master's, and three doctoral degrees as well as certificate and certification programs.  It was an upper division college (serving only juniors and seniors) from its founding in 1966 until accepting freshmen and sophomores in 2004.

The Penn State Eastgate Center, opened in 1991 in downtown Harrisburg, contains state agencies such as the Pennsylvania Securities Commission and Pennsylvania Municipal Retirement System as well as hearing rooms for workers compensation that also occupy space in the building. As of June 1, 2012, all classrooms and administrative personnel previously located in this building were relocated to the Middletown campus.

Academics
As a college and graduate school of the Pennsylvania State University, Penn State Harrisburg grants associate, bachelor's, master's, and doctoral degrees. In addition to the 33 full baccalaureate programs it offers, as one of the 24 campuses of the Penn State, the college also offers the first two years of study leading to more than 160 majors offered throughout the Penn State system. The college also houses 24 master's degree programs, as well as doctoral programs in Adult Education, American Studies, and Public Administration.

At the transfer level, the college serves students from all Commonwealth campuses of the Pennsylvania State University, as well as students from community colleges and other accredited colleges and universities.

The college also is the academic and administrative home of the Penn State Intercollege Master of Professional Studies Program in Homeland Security (iMPS-HLS), a partnership of six Penn State colleges sponsoring an online graduate degree program delivered by Penn State World Campus.

Location
Penn State Harrisburg's campus is easily accessible via major interstate routes and the Pennsylvania Turnpike at exit 247. Harrisburg International Airport is within one mile (1.6 km) of the campus, and public transportation serves the college. The Penn State Hershey Medical Center and Penn State Dickinson School of Law are also located nearby.

The campus lies within 2 hours driving distance from major metropolitan areas, including Philadelphia, Baltimore, and Washington D.C.

Athletics
After a 10-year break from intercollegiate athletics, Penn State–Harrisburg brought back the department as of fall of the 2005–06 academic year. In this short amount of time, they have been able to become members of the NCAA's Division III. They formerly competed primarily in the Capital Athletic Conference (CAC), from July, 2013- June, 2019. Penn State–Harrisburg was formerly a member of the North Eastern Athletic Conference (NEAC) from 2007–08 to 2012–13. Beginning July, 2019 PSU-H will rejoin the NEAC. Penn State–Harrisburg sponsors the following teams: men's and women's basketball, men's and women's cross country, golf, men's and women's soccer, baseball, softball, men's and women's tennis, and women's volleyball. Additionally, club sports are offered on a per semester basis.

Library

As a medium-sized academic library with 275,000 volumes, over 1 million pieces of microfilm, 1,430 journal subscriptions, and 300 databases, the Penn State Harrisburg Library was planned from the outset as a "hybrid" print/electronic library that would easily accommodate new technologies without sacrificing the personal warmth of the traditional library. The library is a  modern facility and officially opened on January 10, 2000, for the start of spring semester.

Research centers and institutes
 Center For Geographic Information Services, provides support for research, education, and outreach efforts requiring the use and analysis of spatial Information. This includes direct assistance to faculty, students, and staff and the development of occasional seminars and workshops on geographic information systems (GIS) software and applications.
 Pennsylvania Center for Folklore, documents, studies, and interprets diverse communities and cultural traditions, especially in Pennsylvania.
 Center for Holocaust and Jewish Studies, organizes research, teaching, and outreach programs on the Holocaust, as well as Jewish life and culture more broadly.
 Center for Survey Research was established to provide professional and technical assistance in survey research methodologies. The CSR serves as a primary resource for state and local government, business, non-profit organizations and public utilities as well as faculty and students who are undertaking opinion research.
 Cooperative Extension Capital Region Office
 Economic Development Research And Training Center
 Institute of State and Regional Affairs
 Eastern American Studies Association
 Pennsylvania Program to Improve State & Local Government
 Pennsylvania State Data Center was established in 1981 by executive order of the governor and is Pennsylvania's official source of population and economic statistics and services. In addition to serving as Pennsylvania's liaison to the Census Bureau, the PSDC also serves as the state's representative to the Federal-State Cooperative Programs for Population Estimates and for Population Projections.

Campus
The campus is built on the site of the decommissioned Olmsted Air Force Base.  The Olmsted Building is the main facility and contains the majority of the campus's classrooms and computer labs.  The campus food court, called Stacks Market, is located on the main level of the Olmsted Building.  Ziegler Commons, an outdoor extension of the food court dining area, was completed in 2006. Additionally, Biscotti's Coffee is located in the Olmsted Building.

In the past several years, major construction projects on campus have been undertaken to accommodate new and existing programs. Beginning with the expansion of the Science and Technology Building to complement study in environmental engineering and environmental pollution control, the college added a state-of-the-art library, new apartment-style housing for 431 students, an expanded food court and Town Square for student activities, and an indoor aquatics center.

Student life
Housing

The college offers both on- and off-campus housing options. The main on-campus housing, The Capital Village, is located on the northeast part of the campus. The housing is conveniently located next to the Olmsted Building, which contains the dining hall and the majority of classrooms.
Additional housing is offered down Olmsted Drive; Nittany Apartments, purchased in 2018, can house up to 260 students in its single-occupancy bedroom 4-person apartments.

Greek Life

The college has five fraternities and three sororities. The fraternities are: Sigma Alpha Epsilon, Phi Sigma Phi, Kappa Alpha Psi, Phi Beta Sigma, and Pi Sigma Epsilon. The sororities are: Kappa Beta Gamma, Sigma Gamma Rho and Chi Upsilon Sigma

Noted faculty 
 Shaun L. Gabbidon
 Simon J. Bronner

References

External links

 Official website

 
Universities and colleges in Harrisburg, Pennsylvania
Educational institutions established in 1966
1966 establishments in Pennsylvania
Harrisburg